Underground is an American television period drama series created by Misha Green and Joe Pokaski about the Underground Railroad in Antebellum Georgia. The show debuted March 9, 2016, on WGN America. On April 25, 2016, WGN renewed the show for a 10-episode second season, that premiered on March 8, 2017. On May 30, 2017, it was announced that WGN had canceled the show after two seasons.  The cancellation came after the network's parent company Tribune Media was attempted to be purchased by conservative corporation Sinclair Broadcasting Group, which incorrectly led to speculation that the latter did not approve of the subject matter of the show.

The Oprah Winfrey Network acquired rebroadcast rights for Underground in 2020.

Cast

Main
 Aldis Hodge as Noah, a driven, perceptive, and restless slave on the Macon plantation. He is one of the Macon 7.
 Jurnee Smollett-Bell as Rosalee, a young, shy, and sheltered house slave on the Macon plantation. She is one of the Macon 7.
 Jessica De Gouw as Elizabeth Hawkes, a socialite with abolitionist ideals.
 Alano Miller as Cato, a cunning and charismatic slave. He is one of the Macon 7.
 Christopher Meloni as August Pullman, a secretive bounty hunter who walks a tightrope between morality and survival.
 Amirah Vann as Ernestine, the head house slave of the Macon plantation, who is fiercely protective of her children. She also uses her sexual relationship with Tom Macon to leverage protection for her children.  He is the father of her two children, Rosalee and James. (recurring season 1, main cast season 2)

Recurring
 Christopher Backus as Jeremiah Johnson, an ex-con and slave catcher. (season 1)
 Marc Blucas as John Hawkes, an abolitionist lawyer.
 Reed Diamond as Tom Macon (ne Hawkes), John Hawkes' brother and the owner of the Macon plantation. (season 1)
 James Lafferty as Kyle Risdin, a US Marshall and Elizabeth's ex-fiancé. (season 1)
 Renwick Scott as Henry, a teenaged slave with a rebellious streak and a heart of gold. He is one of the Macon 7. (season 1)
 Chris Chalk as William Still.
 Adina Porter as Pearly Mae, a strong-willed wife, mother, and slave who first gives voice to the song in which the runners will find clues to help guide them to freedom. Pearly Mae is literate and reads the Bible to her husband Moses, which makes the other slaves believe he is the one who can read, although it is only Pearly Mae who can read.
 Mykelti Williamson as Moses, a fiery preacher for the Macon plantation's field slaves. Many of the slaves believe that he can read the Bible; however, Moses is illiterate. It is his wife Pearly Mae who secretly reads for him. He is one of the Macon 7. (season 1)
 Theodus Crane as Zeke, a formidable slave in both strength and stature. He is one of the Macon 7. (season 1)
 Andrea Frankle as Suzanna Macon, Tom Macon's wife and Pearly Mae's half-sister, who frequently expresses her disdain for Ernestine, her husband's mistress and mother of two of his slave children.
 Toby Nichols as Thomas Roberts "T.R." Macon, Tom and Suzanna's son.
 Mary Katherine Duhon as Mary Macon, Tom and Suzanna's teenage daughter. (season 1)
 Kedrick Brown as Lou, Warrior Prisoner helping Noah to escape. (season 2)
 Johnny Ray Gill as Sam, a talented carpenter and Rosalee and James's older half-brother.
 PJ Marshall as Bill Meekes, the Macon plantation overseer.
 Darielle Stewart as Boo, Moses and Pearly Mae's daughter. Although she is quiet and shy, she is one of the Macon 7. (season 1)
 Maceo Smedley as James, Ernestine's youngest child. He is the younger brother of Sam and Rosalee.
 Michelle Elaine as Corra, a house slave on the Macon Plantation.
 Jannette Sepwa as Sarah, a house slave on the Macon Plantation.
 Brady Permenter as Ben Pullman, August's son. (season 1)
 Clarke Peters as Jay, August's slave. (season 1)
 Jennifer Nettles as Charlotte, August's wife and Ben's mother. (season 1)
 Devyn A. Tyler as Seraphina, Zeke's wife. (season 1)
 Joseph Sikora as Frog Jack, a trader who cares about nothing but money.
 David Born as Jim McNulty, leader of a small group of slave catchers (season 1)
 Wayne Pere as Reverend Willowset, a southern reverend whose support Tom attempts to gain. (season 1)
 David Kency as Clyde, a former slave who helps others escape on the Underground Railroad. (season 1)
 William Mark McCullough as Theo, who helps the Macon 7 escape along the Underground Railroad. (season 1)
 Sadie Stratton as Patty Cannon, an illegal slave trader who kidnapped free blacks and fugitive slaves to sell into slavery in the South.
 Michael Trotter as Elden Donohue, a biographer who plans to write Patty Cannon's life story. (season 2)
 Jesse Luken as Smoke, a slave catcher in Patty Cannon's gang. (season 2)
 Cullen Moss as Jack, a less competent slave catcher in Patty Cannon's gang. (season 2)
 Keith Arthur Bolden as Table Tapper, a preaching slave on the Rowe Plantation. (season 2)
 Tyler Barnhardt as Matthew Roe, master of the Rowe Plantation. (season 2)
 Marcus Hester as Gore, the overseer at the Rowe Plantation. (season 2)
 Aisha Hinds as Harriet Tubman (season 2)
 Bokeem Woodbine as Daniel, a slave who teaches himself to read. (season 2)
 Indigo as Bette, Daniel's wife. (season 2)
 Bailey Tippen as Toosie, Daniel and Bette's daughter. (season 2)
 Neko Parham as Valentine, a runaway who is injured trying to escape. (season 2)
Robert Crayton as Elijah a runaway slave trying to escape.
 Jasika Nicole as Georgia Goodman, an abolitionist who becomes friends with Elizabeth. (season 2)
 Lane Miller as Lucas, an abolitionist in Georgia's group. (season 2)
 Dawntavia Bullard as Emily, an abolitionist in Georgia's group. (season 2)
 Rayan Lawrence as Elliot, an abolitionist in Georgia's group. (season 2)
 Robert Walker-Branchaud as Thad, an abolitionist in Georgia's group. (season 2)
 Rana Roy as Devi, Cato's lover. (season 2)
 Alex Collins as Francis, Cato's manservant. (season 2)
 DeWanda Wise as Clara, an ambitious, vengeful slave on the Rowe Plantation. (season 2)
 Robert Christopher Riley as Hicks, Ernestine's lover on the Rowe Plantation. (season 2)
 Jordane Christie as French, Ernestine's deceased husband, Sam's father (season 2)
 John Legend as Frederick Douglass (season 2, Legend is also an executive producer on the show)
 Candice Glover as Gullah Woman #1 (season 2)
 Angela Bassett as Midwife

Production
On February 27, 2015, WGN America gave a 10-episode straight-to-series order for the series which is created by Misha Green and Joe Pokaski. Season one was filmed in Baton Rouge, Louisiana.
Season two was filmed in Savannah, Georgia.

Broadcast
In Canada, the show was broadcast on Bravo. Season one was made available on the Australian streaming platform, Stan, in January 2017. In the United Kingdom, the show was broadcast on Sky1.

Episodes

Series overview

Season 1 (2016)

Season 2 (2017)

Critical reception
On review aggregator website Rotten Tomatoes, the first season of Underground holds an approval rating of 93% with an average score of 7.3/10 based on 30 reviews. The site's critics consensus reads, "Underground blends credible terror with enough compelling thrills to overcome the storyline's occasional cliches." On Metacritic, the first season has a weighted average score of 75 out of 100, based on 32 critics, indicating "generally favorable reviews". Dan Fienberg of The Hollywood Reporter gave the first season a positive review, stating that "Underground is a thriller, an adventure yarn, before it's a Brussels sprouts message drama." Joshua Alston of The A.V. Club gave the series an A– and wrote: "Underground benefits from its deliberate pacing. This is, after all, a heist story, except that the thieves are literally stealing their own bodies. All the components of a tense thriller are here." Mekeisha Madden Toby of The Wrap praising for its story, cast and writing which makes this series worth the investment.

Rotten Tomatoes reported that the second season of Underground holds an approval rating of 100%, with an average score of 7.7/10 based on 10 reviews. The site's critics consensus reads, "Anchored by terrific performances, Undergrounds sophomore season shows no signs of slipping, tapping into the same sense of urgency without sacrificing its rich characterization." On Metacritic, the second season has a weighted average score of 79 out of 100, based on 4 critics, indicating "generally favorable reviews".

See also
 List of films featuring slavery
 The Underground Railroad (TV series)

References

External links
 

2010s American drama television series
2016 American television series debuts
2017 American television series endings
English-language television shows
WGN America original programming
Television series by Sony Pictures Television
Television shows set in Georgia (U.S. state)
Television series set in the 19th century
Television series about the history of the United States
Works about the Underground Railroad
Works about American slavery